Paracorsia is a monotypic moth genus of the family Crambidae described by H. Marion in 1959. It contains only one species, Paracorsia repandalis, described by Michael Denis and Ignaz Schiffermüller in 1775. It is found in most of Europe, except Ireland, Fennoscandia and the Baltic region. It has also been recorded from central Asia, including Iran and Kyrgyzstan and North America where it has been recorded in southern Ontario and northern Indiana.

The wingspan is 24–28 mm. Adults are on wing from April to October in two generations per year.

The larvae feed on Verbascum species, including Verbascum lychnitis, Verbascum thapsus and Verbascum phlomoides. Pupation occurs in early spring after hibernating in a case.

References

External links
 UKmoths

Pyraustinae
Crambidae genera
Monotypic moth genera
Moths described in 1775
Moths of Asia
Moths of Europe
Moths of North America
Taxa named by Michael Denis
Taxa named by Ignaz Schiffermüller